National Olympic Committee of the Islamic Republic of Afghanistan, former Afghanistan National Olympic Committee (IOC code: AFG) is the National Olympic Committee representing Afghanistan. Nazar Mohammad Mutmaeen is the current president of the committee as of 2018.

The Olympic committee was created in 1920, but was recognised in 1936, in time for Afghanistan’s Olympic debut at the 1936 Summer Olympics in Berlin, Germany. 

The committee councils Afghanistan’s Olympic movement and organises the participation of athletes in Olympic sports to represent Afghanistan at the Summer Olympics and Summer Youth Olympic, and also the Asian Games. Committee Presidents are elected at Extraordinary General Assemblies (EGAs).

List of Presidents

2009 General Assembly
The inaugural Afghanistan National Olympic Committee Extraordinary General Assembly (EGA) was held on Monday 28 September 2009, at 11am at Kabul Serena Hotel, as per the statutes approved by the Afghan NOC General Assembly and the IOC. All 21 General Assembly members attended. Five women were elected to join the Afghan NOC Board of Directors. Mohammad Zahir Aghbar was elected as President, Sayeed Ahmad Zia was elected Vice President and Jan Alam Hassani was elected as Secretary General. Zahir Aghbar succeeded Mohammad Anwar Jekdalek, who had been President of the committee since 2005.

2014 General Assembly
The Afghanistan National Olympic Committee held the committee’s second Extraordinary General Assembly (EGA) on Wednesday 30 April 2014, at the Hotel Inter-Continental Kabul, as per the statutes approved by the Afghan NOC General Assembly and the IOC. 27 of 29 General Assembly members attended.  Fahim Hashimy was elected as the President, succeeding committee president, Mohammad Zahir Aghba. However, Fahim Hashimy resigned in 2015, and was replaced by his predecessor, Mohammad Zahir Aghba. Though this came after Mahmod Hanif was Acting President for the committee, elected during a sideline general assembly at the OCA Session in 2015 at Ashgabat, Turkmenistan.

2018 General Assembly 
On 5 April 2018, a third EGA was held in Kabul. Hafizullah Wali Rahimi was elected to become the committee's President in elections for four terms. The elections were supervised by IOC representatives from the Olympic Council of Asia (OCA) including the continental body's Asian Games Head of Department, Haider Farman.

Bawar Hotak was elected as a first deputy and first Vice President at the meeting in Kabul and Robina Jalali was chosen as a second deputy for women’s affairs, as well as Mohammad Hashim Karimi being chosen to become a second Vice President for the committee.

See also
Afghanistan at the Olympics
Afghanistan at the Paralympics
Afghanistan at the Asian Games
Sport in Afghanistan

References

External links
Official website

Afghanistan
Olym
Afghanistan at the Olympics
Afghanistan at the Paralympics
Afghanistan at the Asian Games
Afghanistan at the Asian Winter Games
Afghanistan at the Asian Beach Games